Gary Graham (born 29 August 1992) is a Scotland international rugby union player for Newcastle Falcons in the Gallagher Premiership, his position is openside flanker.  Born in Stirling, Scotland, he is the son of former Scotland international prop George Graham but grew up playing rugby in Carlisle, England.

Rugby Union career

Amateur career

He first played for Carlisle and then Gala.

Professional career

On 6 February 2015, Graham signed for English Championship side Jersey Reds on his first professional contract with the Islanders club. On 22 March 2017, Graham signed for Gallagher Premiership Rugby side Newcastle Falcons ahead of the 2017-18 season.

International career

Graham represented the Scotland U20s during the 2012 Six Nations Under-20s Championship and during the 2012 IRB Junior World Championship.

Initially overlooked by the senior Scotland side, Graham received an England call up in December 2017, for the 34 man Six Nations training squad. He was subsequently named in the English squad for the 2018 Six Nations Championship.

Graham had a change of heart in November 2018 and was called up to the Scotland squad. He was subsequently named in the squad for the 2019 Six Nations Championship.

He made his Scotland debut on 2 February 2019 in the Six Nations against Italy. Scotland won 33-20.

References

External links
Newcastle Falcons Profile

1992 births
Living people
Scottish rugby union players
Rugby union players from Stirling
Jersey Reds players
Newcastle Falcons players
Scotland international rugby union players
Scotland Club XV international rugby union players
Rugby union flankers
Carlisle RFC players